Preston Bailey (born July 25, 2000) is an American actor who started acting at the age of two. He is known for appearing in the Showtime television series Dexter and for starring in such films as Judy Moody and the Not Bummer Summer, Children of the Corn, and The Crazies.

Biography
Bailey was born in Portland, Oregon. He is the younger brother of Brennan Bailey, also an actor. He moved to California at the age of five.

Career
Bailey started acting in commercials at the age of two. Some national television commercials starring Bailey include Priceline.com, Clorox, Stouffer's, Juicy Juice, BMW, Bissell, and Mucinex. He guest-starred, in his first acting role, on  Strong Medicine in 2005 as Dougie Nauls. He also starred in such television shows as Criminal Minds, How I Met Your Mother and Numb3rs.

In 2007, he joined the cast of Showtime/CBS serial-killer drama Dexter starring in a recurring role as Rita Morgan's son Cody Bennett. He took over from Daniel Goldman from season one, playing the character in seasons two, three, four and five. He appeared in a total of 34 episodes.

He has also starred in several films. Bailey was cast as Timmy Armstrong in the feature film Nothing But the Truth. He co-starred in New Line Cinemas feature film Amusement, which was filmed in Budapest, Hungary. He was also be seen in the National Geographic / Paramount feature Arctic Tale. Bailey was also cast to play the lead role of boy preacher Isaac Chroner in the television remake of Children of the Corn. In 2010, he guest-starred in an episode of Cold Case and also starred in The Crazies as Nicholas Farnum.

Filmography

Film

Television

Awards and nominations

References

External links

TVGuide Celebrity

2000 births
Living people
American male film actors
American male television actors
American male child actors
Male actors from Portland, Oregon
21st-century American male actors